Ryane Clowe (born September 30, 1982) is a Canadian former professional ice hockey left winger who played in the National Hockey League (NHL) with the San Jose Sharks, New York Rangers and New Jersey Devils. He was drafted into the NHL by the San Jose Sharks in the sixth round, 175th overall, at the 2001 NHL Entry Draft. In 2018, he was named the head coach of the ECHL's Newfoundland Growlers, a position he resigned from in January 2019.
Currently working as a hockey advisor for the New York Rangers.

Playing career

Professional
Having been drafted by the NHL's San Jose Sharks in the sixth round, 177th overall, of the 2001 NHL Entry Draft, Clowe played two full seasons with the Cleveland Barons, San Jose's American Hockey League (AHL) affiliate, and was named team MVP in 2004–05, before splitting time between the Barons and the Sharks in 2005–06.

Clowe appeared in 18 games with the Sharks in the 2005–06 season. In the subsequent off-season, he signed a new three-year contract worth $1.625 million; the contract was a two-way deal for two of its first three years. 
 Approximately halfway through the first season of the contract, in 2006–07, Clowe was given an opportunity to play on the Sharks' first line and power play unit alongside Patrick Marleau and Joe Thornton, where he responded with a career-high 34 points in 58 games. He scored his first career NHL hat-trick on January 6, 2007, in a game against the Columbus Blue Jackets. In the 2007 Stanley Cup playoffs, he scored his first playoff goal on April 13 in the Western Conference Quarterfinals series against the Nashville Predators. Securing his roster spot on the Sharks, he became known for his hard-checking game and willingness to fight when needed.

Clowe played 11 games for the Sharks in 2007–08, then went on injured reserve on October 28, 2007, due to torn knee ligaments. He returned to the lineup on March 30, 2008, in time for the 2008 playoffs, during which he recorded 9 points in 13 games, which was second-best on the team behind only Joe Thornton. On July 6, 2009, Clowe signed a new four-year contract that paid him $3.5 million in each of his first three years and $4 million in his final year.

On April 5, 2012, Clowe reached out from the bench with his stick to illegally interfere with Los Angeles Kings centreman Jarret Stoll. The Sharks went on to win the game 6–5 in a shootout. Although review deemed the move illegal, there was no supplemental discipline by the NHL.

On November 6, 2012, during the 2012–13 NHL lockout, Clowe signed with the San Francisco Bulls of the ECHL.

On February 22, 2013, during a game against the Chicago Blackhawks, Clowe left the bench to start a fight with Blackhawks forward Andrew Shaw. Clowe was assessed a minor penalty for roughing and a game misconduct for leaving the bench on an illegal line change to start a fight. The Sharks lost the game 2–1. After supplemental review, Clowe was given a two-game suspension by the NHL.

On April 2, 2013, Clowe, with his contract set to expire at the end of the 2012–13 season, was traded to the New York Rangers in exchange for a second- and a third-round pick in 2013, as well as a conditional second-round pick in 2014. (The conditional pick was to become a fifth-round pick should Clowe not resign with New York, or should New York fail to win two playoff rounds; both conditions were satisfied and the pick became a fifth-rounder.)

On July 5, 2013, as an unrestricted free agent, Clowe signed a five-year, $24.25 million contract with the New Jersey Devils.

On September 12, 2015, Clowe retired from the NHL after team doctors refused to clear him to return to the ice following a concussion initially sustained in a November 6, 2014, game against the St. Louis Blues.

Coaching career
On July 12, 2016, Clowe was named the assistant coach of his former team, the New Jersey Devils. After two seasons as an assistant, he was hired as a head coach by the Newfoundland Growlers, an expansion team in the ECHL, for the 2018–19 season. He stepped down as head coach in January 2019 due to continuing health issues related to his concussion history. He'd already missed several games in November due to health concerns.

Career statistics

References

External links

1982 births
Living people
Canadian ice hockey forwards
Cleveland Barons (2001–2006) players
Ice hockey people from Newfoundland and Labrador
Montreal Rocket players
New Jersey Devils coaches
New Jersey Devils players
New York Rangers players
People from Newfoundland (island)
Rimouski Océanic players
San Jose Sharks draft picks
San Jose Sharks players
Canadian ice hockey coaches